Cinch was an English record label in the 78-rpm era, publishing cheap records at or below cost, for the purpose of driving out competitors. It was anonymously run by His Master's Voice, and operated between 1913 and 1916.  A brief history and full record listing is published by the City of London Phonograph and Gramophone Society (CLPGS) in their Reference Series of books.

References

English record labels
Record labels established in 1913
Record labels disestablished in 1916